Thomas Barnes may refer to:
Thomas Barnes (cricketer) (1849–1873), English cricketer
Thomas Barnes (journalist) (1785–1841), British journalist and editor of The Times
Thomas Barnes (MP) (1812–1897), MP for Bolton
Sir Thomas Barnes (solicitor) (1888–1964), English government lawyer
Thomas Barnes (Unitarian) (1747–1810), English Unitarian minister and educational reformer
Thomas G. Barnes (1911–2001), American physicist and creationist
Thomas N. Barnes (1930–2003), fourth Chief Master Sergeant of the U.S. Air Force
Thomas Wilson Barnes (1825–1874), English chess master
Tom Barnes (American journalist) (1946–2016), journalist from Pennsylvania
Tom Barnes (bobsleigh) (born 1959), American Olympic bobsledder
Tom Barnes (gymnast) (born 1990), Scottish gymnast
T. Roy Barnes (Thomas Roy Barnes, 1880–1937), British-American actor